St. Augustine Shores is a census-designated place (CDP) in St. Johns County, Florida, United States. As of the 2000 census, the CDP population was 4,922.

Geography
St. Augustine Shores is located at  (29.811123, -81.309872).

According to the United States Census Bureau, the CDP has a total area of 3.5 square miles (9.0 km), of which 3.4 square miles (8.9 km) is land and 0.04 square mile (0.1 km) (0.86%) is water.

Demographics

At the 2000 census there were 4,922 people, 2,269 households, and 1,490 families in the CDP. The racial makeup of the CDP was 95.25% White, 2.03% African American, 0.16% Native American, 1.12% Asian, 0.08% Pacific Islander, 0.59% from other races, and 0.77% from two or more races. Hispanic or Latino of any race were 3.09%.

Of the 2,269 households 19.0% had children under the age of 18 living with them, 54.5% were married couples living together, 8.6% had a female householder with no husband present, and 34.3% were non-families. 28.7% of households were one person and 19.3% were one person aged 65 or older.  The average household size was 2.16 and the average family size was 2.63.

The age distribution was 17.1% under the age of 18, 3.9% from 18 to 24, 21.8% from 25 to 44, 23.2% from 45 to 64, and 34.0% 65 or older.  The median age was 51 years. For every 100 females, there were 83.5 males.  For every 100 females age 18 and over, there were 77.9 males.

The median household income was $40,417 and the median family income  was $46,682. Males had a median income of $35,081 versus $26,250 for females. The per capita income for the CDP was $20,374.  About 4.4% of families and 6.9% of the population were below the poverty line, including 8.9% of those under age 18 and 4.4% of those age 65 or over.

Education
It is in the St. Johns County School District.

Zoned schools include W. D. Hartley Elementary School, Gamble Rogers Middle School, and Pedro Menendez High School.

References

Census-designated places in St. Johns County, Florida
Census-designated places in the Jacksonville metropolitan area
Census-designated places in Florida
Populated places on the Intracoastal Waterway in Florida